"Year of tha Boomerang" is a song by American rock band Rage Against the Machine. It originally appeared in the film and on the soundtrack of Higher Learning in 1994 and was eventually included on their second album Evil Empire (1996). On the back of the soundtrack, the song is called "Year of the Boomerang". Although the track was released as a promotional radio CD single, it was never given a domestic release.

"Year of the Boomerang" made its live debut at Cal State Dominguez Hills in Carson, CA on April 29, 1994.

Spelling

The track was re-recorded and included on their second album, Evil Empire in 1996. The spelling of the track was then altered to "Year of tha Boomerang". The spelling of "tha" in the title is a representation of the common hip-hop pronunciation of the definite article "the". The same spelling is used in the Evil Empire liner notes and lyrics to every song for nearly every instance of the word.

The Higher Learning and album versions are slightly different. While the original version has a more prominent bass and hip hop feel, the Evil Empire version's guitars are mixed significantly heavier.

Lyrical themes and references

The title "Year of tha Boomerang" is a reference to Sartre's quotation "it is the moment of the boomerang", referring to anti-colonial violence in the preface to Frantz Fanon's The Wretched of the Earth.

The lyrics appear to be about minority representation and equality, as they contain several references to struggles against racism, sexism, and colonialism. These include the lines;

"Tha sistas are in so check tha front line/It seems I spent the 80s in a Haiti state of mind"

As well as;

"It's dark now in Dachau and I'm screamin' from within/'Cause I'm still locked in tha doctrines of tha right/Enslaved by Dogma, ya talk about my birthright/Yet at every turn I'm runnin' into Hells gates/So I grip the cannon like Fanon and pass tha shells to my classmates"

The song also contains the anthemic reprise; "I got no property but yo I'm a piece of it/So let the guilty hang" -  in reference to the persecution by those in power of the masses, or the repressed.

"All power to the people" was the central motto of the Black Panther Party. The Mount Tai mention is a reference to a Maoist passage the Party's founder, Huey P. Newton, was fond of: "To die for the revolution is heavier than Mount Tai."

Personnel
Written in the liner notes as Guilty Parties:

Vocals - Zack de la Rocha
Bass - Tim Commerford
Drums - Brad Wilk
Guitars - Tom Morello

In popular culture 

 In 2019, supporters of the QAnon movement co-opted "Year of tha Boomerang" to assert that the lyrics support the agenda of the movement's leader and allude to former President Barack Obama's citizenship, even though the song and the band's lyrics as a whole are considered left-wing, and the fact the song was released in 1994, fourteen years before Obama was elected president.

References

External links
 Official Website
 Axis of Justice Tom Morello and Serj Tankian's Activist Website "Axis Of Justice"
 

Rage Against the Machine songs
1994 singles
Song recordings produced by Brendan O'Brien (record producer)
1994 songs
Songs written by Tom Morello
Songs written by Brad Wilk
Songs written by Tim Commerford
Songs written by Zack de la Rocha
Songs against capitalism
Epic Records singles